The 2015 Men's Oceania Cup was the ninth edition of the men's field hockey tournament. It was held from 21 to 25 October in Stratford.

The tournament served as a qualifier for the 2016 Summer Olympics.

Australia won the tournament for the ninth time, defeating New Zealand 3–2 in the final.

Teams

Results
All times are local (NZDT).

Preliminary round

Pool

Fixtures

Classification

Third and fourth place

Final

Statistics

Final standings

Goalscorers

References

External links
FIH.com (Men)

2015
Oceania Cup
Oceania Cup
2015 Oceania Cup
Oceania Cup
Field hockey at the Summer Olympics – Oceanian qualification
October 2015 sports events in New Zealand